The 2008–09 daytime network television schedule for four of the five major English-language commercial broadcast networks in the United States covers the weekday daytime hours from September 2008 to August 2009. The schedule is followed by a list per network of returning series, and any series canceled after the 2007–08 season.

Affiliates fill time periods not occupied by network programs with local or syndicated programming. PBS – which offers daytime programming through a children's program block, PBS Kids – is not included, as its member television stations have local flexibility over most of their schedules and broadcast times for network shows may vary. Also not included are stations affiliated with Fox or MyNetworkTV, as neither network offers (and continues not to offer) a daytime network schedule or network news, and Ion Television, as its schedule was composed mainly of paid programming and syndicated reruns at the time.

Legend

 New series are highlighted in bold.

Schedule
 All times correspond to U.S. Eastern and Pacific Time scheduling (except for some live sports or events). Except where affiliates slot certain programs outside their network-dictated timeslots, subtract one hour for Central, Mountain, Alaska, and Hawaii-Aleutian times.
 Local schedules may differ, as affiliates have the option to pre-empt or delay network programs. Such scheduling may be limited to preemptions caused by local or national breaking news or weather coverage (which may force stations to tape delay certain programs in overnight timeslots or defer them to a co-operated station or digital subchannel in their regular timeslot) and any major sports events scheduled to air in a weekday timeslot (mainly during major holidays). Stations may air shows at other times at their preference.

Monday-Friday

 Note: ABC, NBC and CBS offer their early morning newscasts via a looping feed (usually running as late as 10:00 a.m. Pacific Time) to accommodate local scheduling in the westernmost contiguous time zones or for use a filler programming for stations that do not offer a local morning newscast; some stations without a morning newscast may air syndicated or time-lease programs instead of the full newscast loop.

Saturday

Sunday

By network

ABC

Returning series:
All My Children
America This Morning
General Hospital
Good Morning America
One Life to Live
This Week with George Stephanopoulos
The View
World News with Charles Gibson
ABC Kids
The Emperor's New School 
Hannah Montana 
Power Rangers Jungle Fury
The Replacements 
The Suite Life of Zack and Cody 
That's So Raven 

New series:
ABC Kids
Power Rangers RPM

Not returning from 2007–08:
ABC Kids
Power Rangers Operation Overdrive
NBA Access with Ahmad Rashad

CBS

Returning series:
As the World Turns
The Bold and the Beautiful
The Early Show
CBS Evening News
CBS Morning News
CBS News Sunday Morning
Face the Nation
Guiding Light
The Price is Right
The Saturday Early Show
The Young and the Restless
KEWLopolis
Cake 
Care Bears: Adventures in Care-a-lot
Dino Squad
Horseland
Strawberry Shortcake
Sushi Pack

Not returning from 2007–08:
KEWLopolis
Sabrina: The Animated Series
Trollz

NBC

Returning series:
Days of Our Lives
Early Today
Meet the Press
NBC Nightly News
Today
Qubo
3-2-1 Penguins!
Babar 
Jane and the Dragon 
My Friend Rabbit
VeggieTales
The Zula Patrol

New series:
Qubo
Turbo Dogs

Not returning from 2007–08:
Qubo
Dragon
Jacob Two-Two
Postman Pat

Fox

Returning series:
Fox News Sunday
This Week in Baseball
4Kids TV
Biker Mice from Mars
Chaotic
Di-Gata Defenders
Kirby: Right Back at Ya! 
Sonic X 
Teenage Mutant Ninja Turtles
Winx Club 

New series:
Weekend Marketplace

Not returning from 2007–08:
4Kids TV
The Adrenaline Project
Dinosaur King (moved to The CW4Kids)
Viva Piñata (moved to The CW4Kids)
Yu-Gi-Oh! GX

The CW

Returning series:
Everybody Hates Chris 
The Game 
The CW4Kids
Chaotic
Magi-Nation
Skunk Fu!
The Spectacular Spider-Man
Teenage Mutant Ninja Turtles
Will & Dewitt

New series:
4Real
The Drew Carey Show 
The Jamie Foxx Show 
Judge Jeanine Pirro
The Wayans Bros. 
The CW4Kids
Dinosaur King
GoGoRiki
Huntik: Secrets & Seekers
Kamen Rider: Dragon Knight
Kirby: Right Back at Ya! 
Sonic X 
Viva Piñata
Winx Club 
Yu-Gi-Oh! 5D's

Not returning from 2007–08:
All of Us 
Girlfriends
Gossip Girl
One Tree Hill
Reba 
What I Like About You 
Kids WB!/The CW4Kids
The Batman
Eon Kid
Johnny Test (moved to Cartoon Network)
Legion of Super Heroes
Shaggy & Scooby-Doo Get a Clue!
Tom and Jerry Tales
World of Quest
Yu-Gi-Oh! GX

Renewals and cancellations

Cancellations/series endings

CBS
Guiding Light—Canceled after 72 seasons (57 years on television and 19 years on radio, with simultaneous radio and television broadcasts from 1952 to 1956) on April 1, 2009; the series concluded its CBS run on September 18, 2009.

See also
2008–09 United States network television schedule (prime-time)
2008–09 United States network television schedule (late night)

References

Sources
 
 
 

United States weekday network television schedules
2008 in American television
2009 in American television